Datuk Dr. Hee Tien Lai (20 February 1941 – 21 February 2016) was a Malaysian politician of the Malaysian Chinese Association (MCA), a component party of National Front or Barisan Nasional (BN) coalition.

Hee contested and won the Malaysia General Election 1974, 1978 and 1982 for the seat in Ayer Hitam, Johor to be Member of Parliament for three terms. He was one of the Deputy Speakers of the Dewan Rakyat from 14 June 1982 until 26 July 1983.

Hee is an alumnus of Batu Pahat High School, the same high school where Lim Kit Siang, Lim Guan Eng, Dato Sri Vincent Tan Chee Yioun (Berjaya Corp. owner), Dr. Chua Soi Lek (Former Health Minister) and other prominent figures studied.

He later resigned to migrate to Australia and carried out a successful medical practice.

Death
Hee died of heart attack at a private hospital at George Town, Penang on 21 February 2016 after attended his 75th birthday reunion celebration bash dinner at a hotel earlier that night before.

Election results

See also
 Ayer Hitam (federal constituency)

References 

1941 births
2016 deaths
Malaysian medical doctors
Malaysian politicians of Chinese descent
Malaysian Chinese Association politicians
Members of the Dewan Rakyat
Malaysian emigrants to Australia